Lamine Ghezali (born 6 July 1999) is a French professional footballer who plays as a winger for Liga II club Dinamo București.

Club career
Ghezali played youth football up to the age of 15 with Torcy, moving to the training centre of Saint-Étienne in August 2014. He made his Ligue 1 debut on 23 April 2017 against Rennes. Top scorer in the under-19 side, he signed his first professional contract, for three years, on 27 June 2017. He scored his first senior goal with Saint-Étienne in a 5–0 victory at Caen in Ligue 1 on 16 March 2019.

In July 2019, Ghezali was loaned to Ligue 2 side Châteauroux for the 2019–20 season. He was loaned out again in July 2020, this time to Championnat National side SC Lyon. On 15 January 2022, he made his Ligue 1 return for Saint-Étienne in a 2–1 home loss to Lens.

On 17 August 2022, Ghezali joined Romanian side Dinamo București.

Personal life
Born in France, Ghezali is of Algerian descent.

Career statistics

References

External links

1999 births
Living people
French footballers
France youth international footballers
French sportspeople of Algerian descent
Association football forwards
US Torcy players
AS Saint-Étienne players
LB Châteauroux players
Lyon La Duchère players
FC Dinamo București players
Championnat National 3 players
Ligue 1 players
Championnat National 2 players
Ligue 2 players
Championnat National players
Liga II players
French expatriate footballers
Expatriate footballers in Romania
French expatriate sportspeople in Romania